Wahlström or Wahlstrom is a Swedish surname, which means "meadow by a stream". It may refer to:

Becky Wahlstrom (born 1975), American actress 
Emil Wahlström (born 1987), Swedish football player
Eva Wahlström (born 1980), Finnish boxer
Göte Wahlström (born 1951), Swedish politician
Jarl Wahlström (1918–1999), Finnish religious leader 
Johannes Wahlström (born 1981), Swedish journalist 
Lydia Wahlström (1869–1954), Swedish historian
Magnus Wahlström (1903–1972), American entrepreneur
Oliver Wahlstrom (born 2000), American ice hockey player
Oskar Wahlström (born 1976), Swedish football player
Richard Wahlstrom (1931–2003), American rower
Sigrid Wahlström (1888–1984), Swedish painter

See also
Wahlström & Widstrand, a Swedish book publisher
Wahlstrom Peak, Antarctica

Swedish-language surnames